Čaňa is a village and municipality in Košice-okolie District in the Košice Region of eastern Slovakia.

History
In historical records the village was first mentioned in 1164.

Geography
The village lies at an altitude of 177 metres and covers an area of 11.555 km².
It has a population of about 6,000 people.

Ethnicity
The population is almost entirely Slovak in ethnicity.

Government

The village has its own police force and fire brigade but the district and tax offices are located in Košice.

Economy and facilities
The village has also developed medical facilities including a Pharmacy and outpatient facilities for children and adolescents and a gynaecologist.
The village also has a Slovakian bank and insurance branch, and a post office.

Culture
The village has a public library and a DVD rental store, and a number of food stores. Čaňa has its own cinema and the village is connected to satellite television.

Sport
The village has a football pitch, four tennis courts, hockey stadium, a swimming pool and a gymnasium.

The most popular sport is football and local team FK Čaňa.

Transport
The village has a railway station, however, it is not currently served by any passenger services. Čaňa also has a garage and a facility for car parts.

Genealogical resources

The records for genealogical research are available at the state archive "Statny Archiv in Kosice, Slovakia"

 Roman Catholic church records (births/marriages/deaths): 1787-1896 (parish B)
 Greek Catholic church records (births/marriages/deaths): 17911896 (parish B)
 Reformated church records (births/marriages/deaths): 1800-1895 (parish A)

See also
 List of municipalities and towns in Slovakia

References

External links
http://www.statistics.sk/mosmis/eng/run.html
Surnames of living people in Cana

Villages and municipalities in Košice-okolie District